Chaz Lucius (born May 2, 2003) is an American junior ice hockey center for the Portland Winterhawks in the Western Hockey League (WHL) as a prospect to the Winnipeg Jets of the National Hockey League (NHL).  Lucius was drafted in the first round, 18th overall, by the Winnipeg Jets in the 2021 NHL Entry Draft. Lucius played collegiate hockey with the Minnesota Golden Gophers in the NCAA.

Playing career
Following his freshman season with Minnesota, Lucius concluded his collegiate career by signing a three-year, entry-level contract with the Winnipeg Jets on April 27, 2022. Lucius began his professional career with the Jets AHL affiliate Manitoba Moose recording 5 points (2 goals and 3 assists) in 12 games. After returning from the World juniors, on January 9th Lucius was assigned to play major junior hockey for the remainder of the 2022-23 season with the Portland Winterhawks of the Western Hockey League (WHL) - he was originally selected by the Winterhawks in the 2018 WHL draft (4th round; 74th overall).

Despite being assigned on January 9th, due to the team being on a East Division road trip, Lucius didn't make his debut until January 20th against the Victoria Royals, recording 2 assists in a 7-6 OT win.

International play

On December 12, 2022, Lucius was named to the United States men's national junior ice hockey team to compete at the 2023 World Junior Ice Hockey Championships. During the tournament he recorded five goals and two assists in seven games and won a bronze medal.

Career statistics

Regular season and playoffs

International

References

External links
 

2003 births
Living people
American ice hockey centers
Manitoba Moose players
Minnesota Golden Gophers men's ice hockey players
National Hockey League first-round draft picks
Portland Winterhawks players
Sportspeople from Lawrence, Kansas
USA Hockey National Team Development Program players
Winnipeg Jets draft picks